Cleidiocarpon is a genus of plant of the family Euphorbiaceae first described as a genus in 1965. It is native to China and Indochina.

Species
 Cleidiocarpon cavaleriei (H.Lév.) Airy Shaw - Yunnan, Guizhou, Guangxi, Vietnam
 Cleidiocarpon laurinum Airy Shaw - Thailand, Myanmar

References

Epiprineae
Euphorbiaceae genera